Ben M. Skall (February 11, 1919 – October 25, 1993) was a member of the Ohio Senate, serving from 1981 to 1984. He represented the 22nd District, which was based out of Cuyahoga County, Ohio.

References

1919 births
1993 deaths
Politicians from Cleveland
Republican Party Ohio state senators
20th-century American politicians